Sewell Mountain is a summit in Fayette County, West Virginia, in the United States.

Sewell Mountain was named after Stephen Sewell, a local pioneer who was killed by Indians.

References

Mountains of Fayette County, West Virginia
Mountains of West Virginia